The  is a motorsports museum located in the Fuji Speedway Hotel, on the west side of Fuji Speedway, in Oyama, Suntō District, Shizuoka Prefecture, Japan. It opened in 2022.

Overview 
The museum aims to introduce the history of motorsports for over 130 years, including roughly 40 exhibits systematically presented.

The museum is a permanent exhibition facitlity housed in the Fuji Speedway Hotel building, located right next to Fuji Speedway, one of the largest racing circuits in Japan. The museum occupies the first and second floors of the hotel building. The museum, hotel and circuit together make up "Fuji Motorsports Forest", a regional development project promoted by Toyota Motor Comnapny and Fuji Speedway.

Collection 
Almost all of the collection are racing automobiles. In addition, there are some exhibits of motorsports related materials to tell the thoughts of the creators of the vehicles.

Although the museum is funded by the Toyota Group and under the supervision of the Toyota Automobile Museum, the exhibits are not limited to the Toyota's automobiles. The museum follows the same policy as the Toyota Automobile Museum (similar to the Volkswagen Group's ZeitHaus in the Autostadt, Germany), displaying automobiles of the various manufacturers with cooperation of 10 Japanese and foreign automobile companies, and other cooperating organizations.

Exhibit cooperating companies/organizations 

 The Henry Ford
 Hino Motors
 HKS
 Honda & Honda Collection Hall
 Mazda
 Meredes-Benz AG
 Mitsubishi Motors
 
 Nissan
 Porsche
 Subaru
 Toyota & Toyota Automobile Museum
 Yamaha Motor Company

List of vehicles (partial) 
Exhibit vehicles are scheduled to be replaced irregularly.

Notes:
 [R] Highly detailed replica built by each automobile manufacturer.

References

External links 
 Official website

Auto racing museums and halls of fame
Automobile museums in Japan
Museums in Shizuoka Prefecture
Museums established in 2022
2022 establishments in Japan
Oyama, Shizuoka
Toyota